Vladislav Mikhailovich Ternavsky (born 2 May 1969) is a Russian football coach and former player. He is the assistant coach with the Under-19 squad of FC Arsenal Tula.

Playing career
He earned 7 caps for Russia from 1994 to 1996, and played in the 1994 FIFA World Cup. The clubs he played for included FC Dynamo Kyiv, FC Spartak Moscow, FC Saturn Ramenskoe, FC Rostov and FC Shinnik Yaroslavl.

Honours
 Russian Premier League champion: 1994.
 Ukrainian Premier League runner-up: 1995, 1996.
 Kazakhstan Premier League champion: 2002.
 Russian Cup winner: 1994.

European club competitions
 European Cup 1991–92 with FC Dynamo Kyiv: 1 game.
 UEFA Champions League 1993–94 with FC Spartak Moscow: 4 games.
 UEFA Champions League 1994–95 with FC Spartak Moscow: 2 games.

External links
 Profile at RussiaTeam 

1969 births
Living people
Footballers from Kyiv
Association football defenders
Soviet footballers
Russian footballers
Russia international footballers
Russian expatriate footballers
Expatriate footballers in Kazakhstan
Ukrainian footballers
Russian people of Ukrainian descent
Ukrainian expatriate footballers
Expatriate footballers in Russia
1994 FIFA World Cup players
FC Dynamo Kyiv players
FC Spartak Moscow players
FC Chornomorets Odesa players
FC Tekstilshchik Kamyshin players
FC Saturn Ramenskoye players
FC Rostov players
FC Dynamo Stavropol players
FC Shinnik Yaroslavl players
FC Lokomotiv Nizhny Novgorod players
FC Volgar Astrakhan players
FC Irtysh Pavlodar players
Russian Premier League players
Ukrainian Premier League players
Kazakhstan Premier League players
Russian football managers